Elverum Hospital is a general hospital situated in Elverum, Norway. It is part of Innlandet Hospital Trust, part of the Southern and Eastern Norway Regional Health Authority.

References

Hospitals in Norway
Elverum
Hedmark County Municipality
Heliports in Norway
Airports in Innlandet
Hospitals established in 1878